Slavery has been called "deeply rooted" in the structure of the Northwestern African country of Mauritania, and "closely tied" to the ethnic composition of the country, despite the ending of slavery across other African countries and colonial owners banning it in 1905.

The French colonial administration declared an end to slavery in Mauritania in 1905, but the size of Mauritania prevented enforcement. In 1981, Mauritania became the last country in the world to abolish slavery, when a presidential decree abolished the practice. However, no criminal laws were passed to enforce the ban. In 2007, "under international pressure", the government passed a law allowing slaveholders to be prosecuted. 

Despite this, in 2018 Global Slavery Index estimated the number living in slavery in the country to be 90,000 (or 2.1% of the population), which is a reduction from the 140,000 in slavery figure which the same organisation reported in 2013, while in 2017 the BBC reported a figure of 600,000 living in bondage. 

A November 2009 United Nations mission, headed by UN Special Rapporteur Gulnara Shahinian, evaluated slavery practices in the country. In an August 2010 report to the United Nations Human Rights Council (UNHRC) it concluded that "despite laws, programmes and difference of opinion with regard to the existence of slavery in Mauritania,... de-facto slavery continues to exist in Mauritania". According to the Global Slavery Index 2014 compiled by Walk Free Foundation, there are an estimated 155,600 enslaved people in Mauritania, ranking it 31st of 167 countries by absolute number of slaves, and 1st by prevalence, with 4% of the population. The Government ranks 121 of 167 in its response to combating all forms of modern slavery.

Sociologist Kevin Bales and Global Slavery Index estimate that Mauritania has the highest proportion of people in slavery of any country in the world. While other countries in the region have people in "slavelike conditions", the situation in Mauritania is "unusually severe", according to African history professor Bruce Hall, and consists largely of the black Mauritanian population enslaved by Arab masters.

The position of the government of Mauritania is that slavery is "totally finished... all people are free." According to the abolitionist Abdel Nasser Ould Ethmane, many Mauritanians believe that talk of slavery "suggests manipulation by the West, an act of enmity toward Islam, or influence from the worldwide Jewish conspiracy." Some human rights groups say the government might have jailed more anti-slavery activists than slave owners.

One person, Oumoulmoumnine Mint Bakar Vall, has been prosecuted for owning slaves. She was sentenced to six months in jail in January 2011. 

Two academics, Ahmed Meiloud and Mohamed El Mokhtar Sidi Haiba, have criticized statements on slavery in Mauritania by anti-slavery organizations and writers for alleged exaggeration, lack of statistical sources and factual errors.

Background and practice

Slave status has been passed down through the generations. The descendants of black Africans captured during historical slave raids now live in Mauritania as "Black Moors" or haratin; some of them still serve as slaves to the lighter-skinned "White Moors" or beydan ("Whites") (which are Berbers or mixed Berber-Arabs, descendants of slave-owners known collectively as al-beydan). According to Global Slavery Index, slavery of adults and children in Mauritania "primarily takes the form of chattel slavery" (i.e. the slaves and their descendants "are the full property of their masters"). Slaves "may be bought and sold, rented out and given away as gifts". Slavery in Mauritania is "prevalent in both rural and urban areas", but women are reportedly "disproportionately affected" by slavery. Female slaves "usually work within the domestic sphere", caring for children and doing domestic chores, but "may also herd animals and farm". Female slaves "are subject to sexual assault by their masters". Because slave status is matrilineal, slaves typically serve the same families that their mothers and grandmothers did. They usually sleep and eat in the same quarters as the animals of their owning families. Slaves are "not restrained by chains" but by "economic" and "psychological" factors. They are denied education in secular fields that provide job skills, and taught that "questioning slavery is tantamount to questioning Islam". There is also a "grey area" or "a continuum" between slavery and freedom in Mauritania—referred to politely as the "vestiges of slavery"—where sharecroppers and workers are exploited by Beydane landowners and bosses. According to Ahmed Vall Ould Dine of Mauritanian Human Rights Watch, "Slaves tend to develop very close relations with their masters; the freed ones, who are poor and have inherited nothing from their parents, chose to remain under the auspices of their ex-masters as they provide them with basic necessities of life."

According to the US State Department 2010 Human Rights Report, abuses in Mauritania include:

...mistreatment of detainees and prisoners; security force impunity; lengthy pretrial detention; harsh prison conditions; arbitrary arrests; limits on freedom of the press and assembly; corruption; discrimination against women; female genital mutilation (FGM); child marriage; political marginalization of southern-based ethnic groups; racial and ethnic discrimination; slavery and slavery-related practices; and child labor.

The 2010 report continued: "Government efforts were not sufficient to enforce the antislavery law. No cases have been successfully prosecuted under the antislavery law despite the fact that 'de facto' slavery exists in Mauritania."

Child slavery

Child labor also remains prevalent throughout Mauritania. The Mauritanian government conducted a raid in Nouakchott in November 2017 and rescued 42 child slaves who were held by Koranic instructors. According to the United States Department of Labor, violation of child slavery laws is rarely punished. The Special Brigade for Minors investigated 406 cases of child exploitation; however, it is unclear whether the Mauritanian legal system further investigated or punished anyone involved in those particular cases. Child slavery continues to be an issue in Mauritania because the status is passed down maternally from mother to child.

French colonialism
The French colonized Mauritania in 1904 during the Scramble for Africa. Mauritania and other territories the French owned were referred to as sociétés esclavagistes or "slave societies" because slavery was a tradition that they interacted with. The French reshaped slavery socially because "French administrators and French missionaries created a role for themselves... that was, for the most part, compatible with local cultural customs". However, there was not that great of an economic impact; the prices were not raised high enough to promote a greater supply of slaves.

There were several interpretations of the impact that colonialism had on African societies. Mahmood Madani believed that colonialism let the chief's power go unchecked because of the authority that backed them. However, other scholars believed that there was not a change of African institutions because Europeans were simply consumers. Either way, the French made themselves a part of an already existing slave trade in Mauritania.

The French controlled their territories by the use of African employees from those territories. Mauritanian employees worked low-level positions and the "colonial hierarchy operated on the assumption that its African employees would act as transparent, unthinking conduits who would link white colonial authorities to black African colonial subjects". The African employees were not seen as a threat despite the fact that they had the ability to control the flow of information between the Mauritanians and the French because of the language barrier.

French abolitionist policies
The French implemented abolitionist policies after their territories failed to comply with a law freeing all slaves. Mauritanian administrators told the French that slavery was a custom in Mauritania, and they could not simply abolish it without societal distress, so they enforced certain policies but still allowed slavery. Slaves in Mauritania were returned to their masters and treated as runaway children. Tirailleurs could claim their children by proving they were not illegitimate; but if they were not, they were slaves.

The French established  ("liberty villages") so that slaves would have an area to be free in Mauritania. They could take refuge there and be taxed by the French. However, within three months the slave could be reclaimed by their masters, and the villages had few resources.

Although the French liberated their other territories successfully, because Islam was so intertwined with slavery the French believed it would go against tradition to enforce abolition in Mauritania. The French also believed that "slaves themselves were simply 'not ready' to be wrenched from their social security, to do so would be to 'sow social disorder. Consequently, domestic slavery as well as colonial slavery was still permitted in Mauritania.

Role of religion
Islam is by far the largest religion in Mauritania, with the Maliki school of Sunni Islam as the dominant form. Maliki Islam in pre-colonial West Africa campaigned hard against the trans-Atlantic slave trade, but in the 19th and 20th centuries many Malikis justified continued slavery inside Mauritania, in some or all of its forms. Still today, the dominant majority of Mauritanians believe that former slaves (irrespective of the status of their manumission) cannot be full and equal citizens, let alone become imams. 

Attempts to end slavery in colonial Mauritania largely failed because abolitionism was molded by Orientalism, or the ideology that Africans were "exotic, intellectually retarded, emotionally sensual, governmentally despotic, culturally passive, and politically penetrable". 

Certain aspects of religion might have had an impact in the preservation of slavery-based structures. Concubinage, for example, was admitted in Islam and quite common. Concubines were expected to be treated humanely. Impressions of freedom were molded by notions of social order, and the belief that God would forgive the sins of slaves if they behaved obediently towards their masters.

After 1980, Mauritania's ulama (clerical scholarly community) came to the consensus that no slaves had been acquired through jihad so there was no (however questionable) sharia-based legitimacy to continue enslavement.

Government position

The government of Mauritania (which is dominated by Beydanes) denies that slavery exists in the country. According to Abdel Nasser Ould Ethmane, a political adviser to the African Union and a cofounder of the abolitionist group SOS Slaves, the Mauritanian government officially says: "Slavery no longer exists, and talk of it suggests manipulation by the West, an act of enmity toward Islam, or influence from the worldwide Jewish conspiracy."

Responding to accusations of human rights abuse, in 2012 the Mauritanian Minister of rural development, Brahim Ould M'Bareck Ould Med El Moctar, stated:

In March 2013, the President established an agency to "combat slavery", known as the "National Agency to Fight against the Vestiges of Slavery, Integration, and Fight against Poverty". The director, Hamdi Ould Mahjoub, a Beydane, told The New Yorker author Alexis Okeowo, "Slavery as an institution, as something accepted by society, does not exist" in Mauritania, and that his agency was working on a program to help farmers and others to build clinics and improve access to water.

According to the Mauritanian government, it has taken action to end all forms of slavery. In 2015, the government expanded the definition of slavery to include child labor, although they have difficulty enforcing anti-slavery laws. The government is underfunded and ill-equipped to deal with slavery.

List of causes of persistence
 Many of the slaves are isolated by illiteracy, poverty, and geography, and do not know that life outside servitude is possible.
 The difficulty of enforcing any laws in the country's vast desert.
 Poverty that limits opportunities for slaves to support themselves if freed.
 Dependence on masters who provide food and clothing to slaves. 
 Difficulty of "running away" and leaving families in large parts of the country that are desert. 
 Belief that slavery is part of the natural order of this society.
 Belief in an interpretation of Islam in which slaves are "told that their paradise is bound to their master and that if they do what the master tells them, they will go to heaven".
 Mauritanian laws, which place the burden of proof on the slave, require that a victim file a complaint before an investigation is launched, and that human rights organisations may not file a case on behalf of a victim, despite the fact that most slaves are illiterate.

In November 2016, an appeals court in Mauritania overturned the jail convictions of three anti-slavery activists and reduced the sentences of seven others to time served leaving three in custody, for their alleged role in a riot in June, as reported by Amnesty International. Another court had originally sentenced the 13 human rights activists and members of the Resurgence of the Abolitionist Movement (IRA) to 15 years in prison.

List of antislavery organizations
 Initiative for the Resurgence of the Abolitionist Movement (IRA-Mauritania), is led by Biram Dah Abeid, a former slave
 Al'Hor الحر (translated as "the free")
 In'itaq إنعتاق (translated as "emancipation")
 SOS Esclaves (meaning "SOS Slaves" in French) aids slaves to escape from their masters, and petitions the government and the clergy to address the problem of slavery, but stops short of aggressively confronting authorities like IRA-Mauritania. As of 2014, he was in his late sixties and so, according to Messaoud, may represent an older generation. In 2011, Messaoud and Biram Dah Abeid held a hunger strike in a Nouakchott police station until the police put a slave owner in jail.

International pressure

As a result of Mauritania's failing to curb slavery, in January 2018, the African Union officially reprimanded the Mauritanian government. The ruling was based on a case involving two brothers, Said Salem and Yarg Ould Salem, who were slaves since birth. The African Union ordered Mauritania to compensate the two brothers, causing activists to claim that the ruling would lay the groundwork enforcing anti-slavery laws within the country. In 2015, the Mauritanian government expanded the definition of slavery to include child labor. Extreme poverty and Islamic norms discourage many slaves from attempting to escape. Racial and ethnic division plays a role in Mauritanian government and society, as most slaves in Mauritania are black Mauritanians while members of the ruling class tend to be Arab.

The international community is increasingly pressuring Mauritania to enforce its anti-slavery laws. Along with the African Union's recent ruling, the United States is considering downgrading its trade relations with Mauritania because of its poor record on enforcing its anti-slavery laws.

See also
 Human rights in Mauritania
 Human trafficking in Mauritania
 Islamic views on slavery
 Slavery in Africa
 Slavery in contemporary Africa

References

External links

Slavery – Mauritania differentiating between facts and fiction Middle East Eye
Anti-Slavery International: Forced labour in Mauritania, Anti-Slavery International
Interview with a former slaveholder from Mauritania, iabolish.org
African Liberation Forces of Mauritania on opposition to slavery
Freedom from Slavery in Mauritania, BBC Radio
Slavery’s last stronghold, CNN documentary
Slavery Lives on in Mauritania, NPR
UNHR Special Rapporteur on Contemporary forms of slavery

Mauritania
Mauritania
Society of Mauritania
Human rights abuses in Mauritania
History of Mauritania
Anti-black racism in Africa
Islam and slavery